The Southern Life Centre is an international style skyscraper in the Central Business District of Johannesburg, South Africa.

History

Construction started in 1970 and was completed in 1973. The  architects were  Monty, Sack, Nurcombe, Summerley, Ringrose and Partners, while the structural engineeriners were Ove Arup and Partners.

Description
It is also known as African Eagle Life Centre/Momentumn Life Centre. It is  notable for having a pyrimide glass shape on its roof. The building is also used for advertising. The skyscraper is located at   45 Commissioner Street 323 m North West of Standard Bank Centre. It is the 15th tallest building in South Africa.

References
Amethyst: Johannesburg Landmarks. Retrieved 11 February 2008.
 Emporis.com

External links

Office buildings completed in 1973
Skyscraper office buildings in Johannesburg
20th-century architecture in South Africa